The women's 1500 metres event at the 2014 World Junior Championships in Athletics was held in Eugene, Oregon, USA, at Hayward Field on 25 and 27 July.

Medalists

Records

Results

Final
27 July
Start time: 15:54  Temperature: 28 °C  Humidity: 37 %

Intermediate times:
400m: 1:08.96 Gudaf Tsegay
800m: 2:17.13 Dawit Seyaum
1200m: 3:23.91 Dawit Seyaum

Heats
25 July
First 4 in each heat (Q) and the next 4 fastest (q) advance to the Final

Summary

Details
First 4 in each heat (Q) and the next 4 fastest (q) advance to the Final

Heat 1
27 July
Start time: 12:14  Temperature: 22 °C  Humidity: 50%

Intermediate times:
400m: 1:09.60 Ekaterina Sokolova
800m: 2:20.89 Alexa Efraimson
1200m: 3:28.35 Sheila Chepngetich Keter

Heat 2
27 July
Start time: 12:24  Temperature: 22 °C  Humidity: 50%

Intermediate times:
400m: 1:05.01 Dawit Seyaum
800m: 2:16.58 Dawit Seyaum
1200m: 3:25.57 Dawit Seyaum

Participation
According to an unofficial count, 29 athletes from 22 countries participated in the event.

References

External links
 WJC14 1500 metres schedule

1500 metres
1500 metres at the World Athletics U20 Championships
2014 in women's athletics